James Francis Caffery (7 May 1872 – 8 June 1918) was a former Australian rules footballer who played with Carlton in the Victorian Football League (VFL).

Notes

External links 		
		
Jim Caffery's profile at Blueseum

		
		

1872 births
Australian rules footballers from Melbourne
Carlton Football Club players
1918 deaths
People from Carlton, Victoria